Harpalus kabakianus is a species of ground beetle in the subfamily Harpalinae. It was described by Kataev in 1988.

References

kabakianus
Beetles described in 1988